Clube Desportivo da Marinha de Guerra de Angola is a semi-professional basketball club from Angola. The club, based in Luanda, is attached to the Angolan Navy and an affiliate of C.D. Primeiro de Agosto. 

The club's men's basketball team made its debut at the Angolan top tier basketball league (Unitel Basket) in 2014, after finishing third at the 2014 Angolan 2nd division basketball championship, as a last-minute replacement to runner-up C.P.P.L. which withdrew for financial motives.

Roster

Depth chart

Manager history
 Walter Costa – 2017
 Paulo Macedo – 2015, 2016
 Aníbal Moreira – 2014

Players

2015–2018

Other sports
Handball

References

External links
Africabasket profile

Basketball teams in Angola
Sports clubs in Angola
2014 establishments in Angola
Basketball teams established in 2014